Francisco Múgica or Francisco Mujica may refer to:

Francisco José Múgica, (1884–1958) Mexican politician and general
Francisco Múgica, (1907–1985), Argentine film director
Francisco Mujica (cyclist) (born 1936),  Venezuelan cyclist
Francisco Mujica (architect) (1899–after 1929), Mexican architect